Mohit Burman  is an Indian businessman. He is currently the managing director of Elephant Capital plc, a public limited company, listed on the Alternative Investment Market of the London Stock Exchange.

He is also promoter and director of Dabur India Ltd. Mohit is also a co-owner of the Indian Premier League cricket team Punjab Kings along with businessman Ness Wadia and actress Preity Zinta.

Early life and education
After completing his schooling from Highgate School, London, he graduated from Richmond College, in Bachelor of Arts, Business Administration and Economics (Double major: Marketing and General Management) and subsequently completed his Master of Business Administration degree, in Finance from Babson Graduate School of Business, Massachusetts.

Career
Burman started his career with Welbeck Property Partnership London and then joined Dabur Finance Ltd., a company specializing in fund and fee-based financial activities, as Senior Manager. He worked in the group's financial services businesses including asset management, life insurance and pensions by setting up an insurance company with the UK's largest insurance company, Aviva. His family in November 2011 had established a joint venture with Espírito Santo Investment Bank to set up an investment banking company in India.

Burman has also been actively involved in expanding Dabur India's presence in overseas markets, and was involved in the acquisition of Balsara Hygiene and Home Care businesses for Rs. 1.43 billion by Dabur India Ltd. on 27 January 2005.

Board memberships
Mohit also holds board membership of different other companies like Federation of Indian Chambers of Commerce & Industry, Dabur International Limited, Universal Sompo General Insurance Co. Ltd., KPH Dream Cricket Pvt. Ltd (Kings XI), Aviva Life Insurance Company India Limited, Markettopper Securities Pvt. Ltd., Elephant India Advisors Pvt. Ltd., Caterham Cars Pvt. Ltd, H&B Stores Ltd., Espirito Santo Securities India Pvt. Ltd.

Sports
Burman is one of a group of promoters who have formed the cricket team Kings XI Punjab. He also owns the Mumbai Hockey India League Team "Dabur Mumbai Magicians" and the Pune team of the Indian Badminton League.

References

People educated at Highgate School
1968 births
Living people
Businesspeople from Kolkata
Indian businesspeople in insurance
Indian Premier League franchise owners